The following list predominantly names notable alumni of the Jagiellonian University (its faculty and other prominent figures affiliated with the university are mostly not featured on this list).

History
Founded in 1364 by King of Poland Casimir the Great, the Jagiellonian University (Polish: Uniwersytet Jagielloński) is considered among the oldest universities in continuous operation in the world as well as one of Poland's two most prestigious academic institutions alongside the University of Warsaw. Alumni and faculty of the university include many internationally acclaimed philosophers, composers, politicians, poets, writers, historians, natural and social scientists. 

Among the most distinguished alumni of the university are: Renaissance polymath Nicolaus Copernicus, theologian and Saint John Cantius, chronicler Jan Długosz, poet Jan Kochanowski, King of Poland John III Sobieski, Enlightenment-era thinker Hugo Kołłątaj, inventor and pioneer of oil industry Ignacy Łukasiewicz, chemist Jan Olszewski, social anthropologist Bronisław Malinowski, mathematician Wacław Sierpiński, playwright Stanisław Wyspiański, Nobel Prize winners Ivo Andrić and Wisława Szymborska, chemist Leo Sternbach, psychiatrist Antoni Kępiński, science fiction writer Stanisław Lem, composer and conductor Krzysztof Penderecki, Pope John Paul II, 6th President of Poland Andrzej Duda, historian Norman Davies, physicist Artur Ekert and neuroscientist Jerzy Vetulani.

List of notable alumni

 John Cantius (1390–1473), scholastic, theologian
 Jan Długosz (1415–1480), historian and chronicler
 Stanisław Kazimierczyk, also known as Saint Stanislaus of Kazimierz (1433–1489), Polish Catholic priest, saint and theologian
 Michał Falkener (ca. 1450–1534), Silesian Scholastic philosopher, astronomer, astrologer, mathematician, theologian and philologist
 Albert Brudzewski (1445–c.1497), astronomer, mathematician, philosopher and diplomat
 Laurentius Corvinus (1465–1527), humanist; lecturer at the university
 Nicolaus Copernicus (1473–1543), astronomer; promoter of heliocentrism
 Maciej Miechowita (1457–1523), Renaissance scholar, historian, chronicler, geographer, medical doctor, alchemist and astrologer
 Francysk Skaryna (1485?–1540?), pioneer of the Belarusian language; first to print a book in an Eastern Slavic language (1517 in Prague)
 Johannes Honter (1498–1549), Transylvanian Saxon, renaissance humanist, Protestant reformer, and theologian
 Andrzej Frycz Modrzewski (1503?–1572), diplomat; political thinker; religious thinker
 Mikołaj Rej (1505–1569), Renaissance poet, writer, translator and theologian
 Marcin Kromer (1512–1589), historian; Prince-Bishop of Warmia
 Ivan Fyodorov (c. 1525–1583), Russian printer regarded as one of the fathers of Eastern Slavonic printing
 Jan Kochanowski (1530–1584), Polish Renaissance poet
 Wawrzyniec Goślicki (ca. 1530–1607) Polish nobleman, Bishop of Poznań, political thinker and philosopher best known for his book De optimo senatore (1568)
 Cyprian Bazylik (1535–1600), composer; musician; poet
 Wojciech Oczko (1537–1599), philosopher, doctor, Royal Secretary to King Sigismund II Augustus
 Bartosz Paprocki (c. 1543 – 1614), writer; historiographer; translator; poet; genealogist
 Jan Brożek (1585 –1652), mathematician, astronomer, physician, poet, writer, musician
 Stanisław Koniecpolski (1590?–1646), military commander; military politician; Grand Hetman of the Crown
 Kasper Twardowski (ca. 1592–ca. 1641), poet of the early Polish Baroque period
 John III Sobieski (1629–1696), military leader; monarch of Polish–Lithuanian Commonwealth; victor of the Battle of Vienna
 Stanisław Dąmbski (ca. 1638–1700), Bishop of Krakow
 Kasper Niesiecki (1682–1744), heraldist, lexicographer and theologian
 Hugo Kołłątaj (1750–1812), a constitutional reformer and educationalist, one of the most prominent figures of the Polish Enlightenment
 Wincenty Pol (1807–1872), poet; geographer
 Ignacy Łukasiewicz (1822–1882), pharmacist and a pioneer of oil industry; deviser of the first method of distilling kerosene from seep oil and builder of the world's first modern oil refinery
 Carl Menger (1840–1921), Austrian economist; lawyer; founder of the Austrian School of economics
 Henryk Jordan (1842–1907), philanthropist, physician and pioneer of physical education
 Edward Janczewski (1846–1918), biologist
 Karol Olszewski (1846–1915), physicist; chemist; the first to liquefy oxygen, nitrogen and carbon dioxide from the atmosphere
 Feliks Koneczny (1862–1949), historian, theatrical critic, librarian, journalist and social philosopher
 Józef Paczoski (1864–1942), botanist
 Kazimierz Przerwa-Tetmajer (1865–1940), Polish Goral poet, novelist, playwright, journalist and writer, a prominent member of the Young Poland movement
 Ignacy Daszyński (1866–1936), socialist politician and journalist
 Stanisław Wyspiański (1869–1907), playwright, painter and poet, as well as interior and furniture designer
 Stanisław Estreicher (1869–1939), historian of law and bibliographer
 Tadeusz Estreicher (1871–1952), chemist, historian and cryogenics pioneer
 Vasyl Stefanyk (1871–1936), Ukrainian modernist writer and political activist
 Bohdan Lepky (1872–1941), Ukrainian writer and poet
 Tadeusz Boy-Żeleński (1874–1941), writer, poet, critic and translator 
 Marian Dąbrowski (1878–1958), journalist, entrepreneur and publisher, the biggest and the most influential press magnate of the Second Polish Republic
 Maria Grzegorzewska (1888–1967), educator, propagator of the special education movement 
 Wacław Sierpiński (1882–1969), mathematician
 Bronisław Malinowski (1884–1942), anthropologist 
 Stanisław Kot (1885–1975), Polish historian and politician
 Sofija Kymantaitė-Čiurlionienė (1886–1958), Lithuanian writer, educator, and activist.
 Stefan Kopeć (1888–1941), biologist and pioneer of insect endocrinology
 Kazimierz Papée (1889–1979), Polish Ambassador to the Holy See 1939–1958
 Tomasz Dąbal (1890–1937), lawyer, activist and politician
 Stanisław Janikowski (1891–1965), diplomat and an Etruscologist
 Oskar Halecki (1891–1973), historian, social and Catholic activist
 Ivo Andrić (1892–1975), Yugoslav novelist and poet, Nobel Prize laureate
 Kazimiera Iłłakowiczówna (1892–1983), poet, prose writer, playwright and translator
 Adam Obrubański (1892–1940), reporter, manager of the Polish National Team, murdered by the Soviets in the Katyn Massacre
 Wacław Jędrzejewicz (1893–1993), Polish Army officer, diplomat, politician and historian
 Adam Heydel (1893–1941), economist and representative of the Cracow School of Economics
 Henryk Sławik (1894–1944), diplomat recognised as Righteous Among the Nations for the rescue of Jews in World War II Hungary
 Arkady Fiedler (1894–1985), writer, journalist and adventurer best known as the author of Squadron 303
 Stanisław Sosabowski (1892–1967), Polish general in World War II
 Leopold Infeld (1898–1968), physicist
 Józef Feldman (1899–1946), historian 
 Volodymyr Kubiyovych (1900–1985), Ukrainian geographer, cartographer, encyclopedist, politician, and statesman
 Adam Vetulani (1901–1976), historian of medieval and canon law
 Yaroslav Halan (1902–1949), Ukrainian anti-fascist playwright and publicist
 Józef Pieter (1904–1989), psychologist, philosopher, pedagogue, researcher, and lecturer
 Oskar R. Lange (1904–1965), economist and diplomat
 Ludwik Gross (1904–1999), Polish-American virologist
 Wanda Wasilewska (1905–1964), novelist and journalist and a left-wing political activist
 Iwo Lominski (1905–1968), bacteriologist
 Edward Rydz-Śmigły (1886–1941), politician, statesman, Marshal of Poland and Commander-in-Chief of Poland's armed forces, as well as a painter and poet
 Tadeusz Pankiewicz (1908–1993), pharmacist and a Righteous Among the Nations
 Lelord Kordel (1908–2001) Polish-American nutritionist and author of books on healthy living
 Adolf Fierla (1908–1967), writer and poet
 Andrzej Dunajewski (1908–1944), zoologist and ornithologist
 Leo Sternbach (1908–2005), chemist; inventor of the benzodiazepine
 Tadeusz Pankiewicz (1908–1993), pharmacist; Righteous Among the Nations who aided Jews in the Kraków Ghetto
 Danuta Gierulanka (1909–1995), mathematics educator, psychologist, philosopher, and translator
 Józef Cyrankiewicz (1911–1989), Communist politician; Prime Minister of Poland 1947–1952, 1954–1970
 Jerzy Turowicz (1912–1999), journalist
 Poldek Pfefferberg (1913–2001), business owner who inspired Schindler's Ark, and its film adaptation, Schindler's List
 Artur Jurand FRSE (1914–2000), geneticist
 Herbert Czaja (1914–1997), German Christian democratic politician
 George Zarnecki (1915–2008), art historian specializing in English Romanesque art
 Sigmund Strochlitz (1916–2006), American activist and Holocaust survivor
 Wilhelm Mach (1916–1965), writer, essayist, poet and literary critic.
 Jerzy Tabeau (1918-2002), cardiologist one of the few escapees from Auschwitz concentration camp
 Antoni Kępiński (1918–1972), psychiatrist
 Mietek Pemper (1920–2011), law student, Holocaust survivor who compiled Schindler's list
 Karol Wojtyła (1920–2005), later John Paul II, Pope of the Catholic Church
 Tadeusz Różewicz (1921–2014), poet, playwright, writer, and translator
 Zbigniew Czajkowski (born 1921), fencer ("Father of the Polish School of Fencing")
 Andrzej Łobaczewski (1921–2007), psychologist who studied totalitarianism and introduced the concept of political ponerology
 Stanisław Lem (1921–2006), science-fiction writer
 Piotr Słonimski (1922–2009), French geneticist, pioneer of yeast mitochondrial genetics
 Wisława Szymborska (1923–2012), poet, 1996 Nobel laureate in Literature
 Anna-Teresa Tymieniecka (1923–2014), philosopher, phenomenologist, founder and president of the World Phenomenology Institute
 Zofia Szmydt (1923–2010), mathematician
 Edmund Niziurski (1925–2013), writer of children's literarure
 Józefa Hennelowa (1925–2020), publicist, journalist, columnist and politician
 Stanisław Łojasiewicz (1926–2002), mathematician
 Yoram Gross (1926–2015), Australian animation producer
 Andrzej Wróblewski (1927–1957), figurative painter 
 Franciszka Szymakowska (1927–2007), geologist
 Krystyna Zachwatowicz (born 1930), scenographer, costume designer and actress
 Czeslaw Olech (1931–2015), mathematician
 Krzysztof Penderecki (1933–2020), composer and conductor
 Andrzej Trzaskowski (1933–1998), jazz composer and musicologist
 Jerzy Vetulani (1936–2017), neuroscientist, pharmacologist and biochemist
 Norman Davies (born 1939), British historian
 Krzysztof Zanussi (born 1939), film and theatre director, producer and screenwriter
 Wojciech Dziembowski (born 1940 in Warsaw), astronomer, member of Polish Academy of Sciences and Polish Academy of Learning
 Maria Olech (born 1941), Antarctic researcher; namesake of the Olech Hills in the Three Sisters point area of Antarctica
 Andrzej Zoll (born 1942), lawyer, former judge and president of the Polish Constitutional Tribunal, former Polish Ombudsman and former president of the State Electoral Commission
 Maria Dzielska (1942–2018), classical philologist, historian, translator, biographer of Hypatia, and political activist
 Adam Zagajewski (1945–2021), poet, translator, essayist
 Tomasz Gizbert-Studnicki (born 1948), jurist and professor of legal sciences specializing in legal theory
 Lidia Morawska (born 1952), physicist
 Jerzy Pilch (1952–2020), writer, columnist, and journalist
 Stanisław Pyjas (1953–1977), anti-communist activist
 Róża Thun (born 1954), politician
 Bat-Erdeniin Batbayar (born c. 1954), Mongolian politician, political analyst and writer
 Zbigniew Preisner (born 1955), film score composer
 Wojciech Inglot (1955–2013), chemist; founder of Inglot Cosmetics
 Marta Kwiatkowska (born 1957), theoretical computer scientist 
 Jan Rokita (born 1959), liberal politician 
 Artur Dmochowski (born 1959), journalist, historian, and diplomat 
 Bogdan Klich (born 1960), politician, former Minister of National Defence of Poland
 Artur Ekert (born 1961), physicist, one of the inventors of quantum cryptography
 Jarosław Gowin (b. 1961), politician and editor, former Minister of Justice and Minister of Science and Higher Education
 Krzysztof Warlikowski (born 1962), theatre director
 Beata Szydło (born 1963), politician, former Prime Minister of Poland
 Wojciech Smarzowski (born 1963), film director and screenwriter
 Robert Makłowicz (born 1963), journalist, historian, television personality and food critic
 Manuela Gretkowska (born 1964), writer, feminist and politician
 Elżbieta Bieńkowska (born 1964), politician, former Deputy Prime Minister and Minister of Regional Development and Transport and European Commissioner
 Grzegorz Hajdarowicz (born 1965), entrepreneur, film producer and publisher
 Jan Hartman (born 1967), philosopher
 Joanna Rajkowska (born 1968), contemporary artist
 Paulo Szot (born 1969), Brazilian opera singer; winner of Tony Award for best actor on Broadway 2008
 Sławomir Dębski (born 1971), historian
 Andrzej Duda (born 1972), lawyer, politician, 6th and current President of Poland
 Agata Kornhauser-Duda (born 1972), former teacher and the current First Lady of Poland
 Jacek Dukaj (born 1974), science fiction and fantasy writer
 Jadwiga Emilewicz (born 1974), politician and political scientist, Deputy Prime Minister of Poland
 Czeslaw Walek (born 1975), Czech lawyer and LGBT activist, studied law at the university 1993–99
 Paweł Kowal (born 1975), politician and former Member of the European Parliament
 Maciej Stuhr (born 1975), actor and comedian
 Władysław Kosiniak-Kamysz (born 1981), politician and physician
 Adam Bielecki (born 1983), alpine and high-altitude climber
 Jakub Żulczyk (born 1983), writer and journalist

See also
List of universities in Poland
Education in Poland

References 

Jagiellonian University
Jagiellonian University alumni